Tropidaster is an extinct genus of sea stars that lived in the Early Jurassic.  Its fossils have been found in Europe.

Sources

 Fossils (Smithsonian Handbooks) by David Ward (Page 187)

External links
Tropidaster in the Paleobiology Database

Velatida
Prehistoric starfish genera
Jurassic echinoderms
Prehistoric echinoderms of Europe